Maine Central 470 is a 4-6-2 "Pacific" type steam locomotive built by the American Locomotive Company (ALCO) in May 1924 for the Maine Central Railroad (MEC). The locomotive is currently owned by the New England Steam Corporation. It is currently located at Washington Junction in Hancock, Maine where it is undergoing restoration to operating condition.

History

Revenue service and retirement
No. 470 was built in May 1924 by the American Locomotive Company (ALCO) in Schenectady, New York, designated as builder's number 65555. Upon purchase, Maine Central Railroad (MEC) numbered the engine 470. Delivery was expected during the summer of 1924.

The locomotive was purchased exclusively for a thriving passenger market serving stops between Boston, Massachusetts and Bangor, Maine. Ridership of the era was creating additional demand for capacity and speed, and Maine Central continued upsizing to larger and more powerful engines such as ALCO's 4-6-2s.

ALCO vigorously promoted their popular 4-6-2s to the railroads, especially in the passenger-dense east coast.  It was purchased for $62,296.90 (the equivalent of ±$839,000 in present-day U.S. dollars).

During its 30 years of service, No. 470 pulled named passenger trains including The Gull, the Bar Harbor Express, and the Kennebec Limited.

The engine was the last steam locomotive to be operated by Maine Central Railroad, and its final run on Sunday, June 13, 1954 was nationally publicized and attracted widespread spectators along its entire route of travel. Passenger service had been in steady decline, and Maine Central discontinued all passenger service in Maine only six years later.

After its final run, Engine No. 470 was transferred to the Railroad's Maintenance Shops in Waterville where it was drained, winterized and towed to a display plinth near the public railroad station. On October 28, 1962, in celebrating Maine Central Railroad's centennial anniversary, the locomotive was officially presented as a gift to the City of Waterville.

Sale and restoration
In 2012, after being exposed to the elements and subsequent hazard to the public, the City of Waterville requested bids for the sale or restoration of the No. 470 locomotive. Of the six bids that were received, only one bidder planned to keep the locomotive in Maine.

On December 3, 2013, the City Council of Waterville voted in favor of selling the No. 470 locomotive to the Maine-based non-profit New England Steam Corporation (NESCo), who entered a delayed purchase and sale agreement with the city, vowing not to preemptively disturb the locomotive until it had successfully raised both the purchase price and the anticipated moving costs. On November 5, 2015, the NESCo successfully purchased the No. 470 locomotive for $25,000 and prepared to move it to the Downeast Scenic Railroad in Ellsworth, Maine.

In 2016, NESCo relocated the No. 470 locomotive to Washington Junction in Hancock, Maine. In cooperation with the Downeast Scenic Railroad, they plan to commence a complete restoration, returning the No. 470 locomotive to operating service. The restoration is now underway, volunteers hope to have the locomotive finished for its 100th anniversary in 2024.

See also
Atlanta and West Point 290
Atlantic Coast Line 1504
Boston and Maine 3713
Florida East Coast 153
Norfolk and Western 578
Pennsylvania Railroad 1361
Reading and Northern 425
Southern Pacific 2467
Southern Pacific 2472
Southern Pacific 2479
Southern Railway 1401
U.S. Sugar 148

References

External links
 New England Steam Corporation 
 Downeast Scenic Railroad

Buildings and structures in Waterville, Maine
Maine Central Railroad locomotives
Standard gauge locomotives of the United States
4-6-2 locomotives
Individual locomotives of the United States
ALCO locomotives
Railway locomotives introduced in 1924
Transportation buildings and structures in Kennebec County, Maine
Preserved steam locomotives of Maine